Get Wet may refer to:

 Get Wet (band), a 1980s pop group
 Get Wet (Krewella album), 2013
 Get Wet (Mental As Anything album), 1979
 The Get Wets, rhythm and blues band

See also 
 I Get Wet, 2001 album by Andrew W.K.
 "Get It Wet", 1997 song by Twista
 Getting wet (disambiguation)
 Wet (disambiguation)